George Brant is an American playwright. Born in Park Ridge, Illinois, he is the author of several award-winning plays, most notably Grounded.

Career 
Brant completed his undergraduate studies at Northwestern University and received his Masters in Fine Arts in Writing from the Michener Center for Writers at the University of Texas at Austin. He is a member of the Dramatists Guild of America.

His most successful play to date is Grounded, which played at London's Gate Theatre and went on to be directed by Julie Taymor in an off-Broadway production at The Public Theater. Grounded won the National New Play Network's 2012 Smith Prize and a Fringe First award at the 2013 Edinburgh Fringe Festival.

Plays 
 Into the Breeches! (2018)
 Dark Room (2018)
 Salvage (2017)
 Marie and Rosetta (2016)
 Good on Paper (2015)
 Grounded (2012). Translated into Spanish as En tierra.
 The Mourners' Bench (2012)
 Three Voyages of the Lobotomobile (2012)
 Grizzly Mama (2011)
 Any Other Name (2009)
 Elephant's Graveyard (2007)

References 

Year of birth missing (living people)
Living people
People from Park Ridge, Illinois
Writers from Chicago
21st-century American dramatists and playwrights
Northwestern University alumni
Michener Center for Writers alumni
21st-century American male writers
American male dramatists and playwrights